Maloye Bikmetovo (Kese Bikmät) is a rural locality (a village) in Tatar-Ulkanovsky Selsoviet, Tuymazinsky District, Bashkortostan, Russia. The population was 14 as of 2010. There is 1 street.

Geography 
Maloye Bikmetovo is located 23 km east of Tuymazy (the district's administrative centre) by road. Bikmetovo is the nearest rural locality.

References 

Rural localities in Tuymazinsky District